Arnaud Burille (born August 11, 1988) is a French freestyle skier, specializing in  moguls.

Burille competed at the 2010 Winter Olympics for France. He finished 22nd in the moguls event.

Burille made his World Cup debut in December 2007. As of February 2013, his best performance at a World Cup event is 6th, in the moguls event at Sierra Nevada in 2009/10. His best World Cup overall finish is 20th, in 2009/10.

References

1988 births
Living people
Olympic freestyle skiers of France
Freestyle skiers at the 2010 Winter Olympics
Sportspeople from Haute-Savoie
French male freestyle skiers